Gipsy Kings is the third album by the French Rumba Catalana band Gipsy Kings, which was released in 1987. The album was their first to reach a worldwide audience, going gold across France, the UK, the US and other countries. The US and European versions of this album are identical except in some cases the song order may differ. The Japanese version released in 1995 includes an alternate version of "Vamos a Bailar". The song "Inspiration" from this album famously appeared in the season five episode of Miami Vice, "World of Trouble", in June 1988.

Track listing

Japanese Bonus Tracks

Singles 

 Bamboléo (31 March 1988)
 Djobi Djoba (25 October 1988)
 Bem, Bem, Maria (25 February 1989)
 Un Amor (29 July 1989)
 Tu Quieres Volver (26 September 1989)
 A Mi Manera (December 1989)

Personnel 
Gipsy Kings
Nicolas Reyes — lead vocals, rhythm guitar
Tonino Baliardo — lead and rhythm guitars
André Reyes — rhythm guitar, backing vocals
Jacques "Max" Baliardo — rhythm guitar
Jahloul "Chico" Bouchikhi — rhythm guitar, handclaps
Maurice "Diego" Baliardo — rhythm guitar, handclaps
Paul "Pablo" Reyes — rhythm guitar

Additional Personnel
Dominique Perrier — synthesizer; arrangements (tracks 1, 3, 5, 12)
Gerard Prévost — bass, synthesizer; arrangements (tracks 2, 4, 6–9, 10, 11)
Claude Salmieri — drums
Marc Chantereau — percussion

Charts and certifications

Chart performance

Weekly charts

Year-End charts

Sales and certifications

See also
 List of best-selling Latin albums

References

External links
Gipsy Kings at Discogs
Gipsy Kings at gipsykings.net

1987 albums
Elektra Records albums
Gipsy Kings albums